Yamangulovo (Yamanğol) is a rural locality (a village) in Otradinsky Selsoviet, Kuyurgazinsky District, Bashkortostan, Russia. The population was 237 as of 2010. There are 2 streets.

Geography 
Yamangulovo is located 27 km south of Yermolayevo (the district's administrative centre) by road. Samartsevo is the nearest rural locality.

References 

Rural localities in Kuyurgazinsky District